Ingrid da Silva Guimarães (born July 5, 1972) is a Brazilian actress, comedian and, television presenter.

Filmography

Television 
 1993 - Mulheres de Areia .... Jurema
 1996 - Chico Total .... Reporter
 1997 - Por Amor .... Tereza
 1999 - Você Decide, O Príncipe da Feira
 1999 - Você Decide, Meu Passado Condena
 1999 - Você Decide, O Dilema de Rosane
 2001 - Sai de Baixo, Um Louro Chamado Desejo .... Zildete
 2001 - Os Normais, Cair na Rotina é Normal .... Denise
 2001 - Escolinha do Professor Raimundo .... Leandra Borges
 2003 - Kubanacan .... Rosita
 2003 - Zorra Total .... Leandra Borges
 2003 - Sob Nova Direção .... Pit 
 2007 - Mulheres Possíveis .... Presenter 
 2008 - Casos e Acasos, O Encontro, O Assédio e O Convite .... Camila
 2008 - Casos e Acasos, O Encontro, o Homem Ideal e a Estréia .... Nina
 2008 - Fantástico .... Leandra Borges
 2009 - Caras & Bocas .... Simone
 2010 - Fantástico .... Herself
 2010 - Os Caras de Pau .... Tati
 2010 - Batendo Ponto  .... Val (Valquíria)
 2011 - Batendo Ponto .... Val (Valquíria)
 2011 - Macho Man .... Helô Fragoso Fraga
 2011 - Aventuras do Didi .... Herself
 2012 - A Grande Família, O Pai do Serginho .... Lili Pessanha
 2012 - 220 Volts, Fama
 2013 - Sangue Bom .... Tina Leão
 2013 - Sai de Baixo, Quem Casa Quer Caco .... Henriqueta do Rego Amado
 2017 - Novo Mundo .... Elvira Matamouros
 2019 - Bom Sucesso .... Silvana Nolasco
 2022 - Nos Tempos do Imperador .... Elvira Matamouros

Film 
 1997 - Amar
 1998 - Alô?! .... Valentina
 2002 - Avassaladoras .... Paula
 2004 - Um Show de Verão .... Jaqueline
 2005 - Depois Daquele Baile .... Beth
 2008 - Polaroides Urbanas .... Verley
 2010 - De Pernas pro Ar .... Alice Segretto
 2011 - Gnomeo & Juliet .... Nanette (Brazilian voice dubbing)
 2012 - Totalmente Inocentes .... Raquel
 2012 - De Pernas pro Ar 2 .... Alice Segretto
 2013 - Minha Mãe é uma Peça .... Soraya
 2016 - Entre Idas e Vindas .... Amanda
 2017 - Fala Sério, Mãe! .... Ângela Cristina Siqueira Paz

Theater 
 1987 - Jardim das Borboletas 
 1992 - Confissões de Adolescente 
 1995 - The Diary of Anne Frank 
 1997 - Duas Mãos 
 1998 - Os Sete Gatinhos 
 2000 - Duas Mãos 
 2000 - A Espera
 2000 - Laboratório de Humor 
 2001 - Cócegas 
 2002 - Cosquinha 
 2012 - Reasons to Be Pretty .... Steph

References

External links 

1972 births
Living people
People from Goiânia
Brazilian telenovela actresses
Brazilian film actresses
Brazilian stage actresses